The Professional Association of Magistrates is one of the five Spanish, professional associations of judges and magistrates. Since judges and magistrates in Spain are barred from joining trade unions, professional associations such as APM have adopted the traditional union role of protecting their employment rights and conditions. APM is the biggest professional association of judges and magistrates in Spain and is considered to be ideologically conservative.

See also
Spanish Judiciary
General Council of the Judicial Power of Spain
Judges for Democracy
Francisco de Vitoria Association

External links
 Official site
 News of Association in ELPAIS.com

Trade unions in Spain
Law of Spain